The granny knot is a binding knot, used to secure a rope or line around an object.  It is considered inferior to the reef knot (square knot), which it superficially resembles.  Neither of these knots should be used as a bend knot for attaching two ropes together.

Etymology 
Called the "granny's knot" with references going back to at least 1849, the knot was so-called because it is "the natural knot tied by women or landsmen".

Tying
When attempting to tie a reef knot (square knot), it is easy to produce a granny knot accidentally.  This is dangerous because the granny knot can slip when heavily loaded.  A tightened granny knot can also jam and is often more difficult to untie than the reef knot.  It is better to tie a reef knot in nearly all circumstances.  One way to distinguish them is that in the reef knot each loop passes completely over, or completely under (not through) the neck of the other.

The reef knot is commonly taught as left over right, tuck under then right over left, tuck under. The granny knot is the first step repeated twice, left over right, tuck under. This is a very common mistake made by people learning to tie a reef knot.

Heraldry
In heraldry, the granny knot is known as the Bourchier knot, due to being a heraldic badge of the Bourchier family.

Related knots

See also

List of binding knots
List of knots

References

External links

 "The Reef Knot Family", NotableKnotIndex.webs.com.